Akwamu was a state set up by the Akwamu people in present-day Ghana. After migrating from Bono state, the Akan founders of Akwamu settled in Twifo-Heman. The Akwamu led an expansionist empire in the 17th and 18th centuries. At the peak of their empire, Akwamu extended  along the coast from Ouidah, Benin in the East to Winneba, Ghana in the West.

History of the Akwamu state

The Akwamu are one of the oldest Akan states along with the Fante and Akyem states. The Akwamu were ruled by the king of all the Aduana abusua (maternal clan). The Aduana along with the Asona are the only groups where intermarriage between the same clan members are allowed amongst Royals. Akwamu expansion started between 1629 and 1710. They expanded into the Akuapem area, including Kyerepon and Larteh, Denkyera, Ga-Adangbe; and the Ladoku states of Agona, Winneba and Afram plains. The powerful King Otumfuo Ansa Sasraku I annexed the Guan and took over the traditional areas of the Kyerepon. He ruled over them until Asonaba Nana Ofori Kuma and his followers, after a succession dispute in an effort to form their own State, engaged them in a fierce war. The Akwamu were driven away from the mountains. These Asona family members and their followers were given a piece of land by the Guan and Kyerepon, the original settlers, to form the Akuapem state. Most of the present Akuapem still have their roots at Akwamufie, especially those bearing the names Addo and Akoto, who are from the Aduana family.

According to Akwamu tradition, Otumfuo Ansa Sasraku I, also played an important role in the life of King Osei Kofi Tutu I of Ashanti by protecting him from Denkyira. It was at Akwamu that Osei Tutu met Okomfo Anokye. With the aid of Akwamu, Ashanti embarked on a series of campaigns which led to the defeat of the Denkyira. The Akwamu empire fell after it was subgjudicated by the Akyem in the 18th century. During the third and fourth Anglo-Ashanti wars, Akwamu tried to help the Ashanti but withdrew their aid, because a diplomatic agreement with British government signed in 1867. Despite this, Akwamu and the Ashanti Empire were still strong allies. They fought in many wars as allies, such as in the "Krepi war" in 1869. 

After the death of Nana Ansa Sasraku, he was succeeded by two kings collectively, Nana Addo Panin and Nana Basua. It was during this time that the Akwamu took over the possession of the trading Danish Castle at Christianborg at Osu, in present-day Accra. At the peak of their power, the Akwamu state encompassed much of the eastern part of the present-day Ghana. The Akwamu also conquered the Ga people and occupied the old Ga Kingdom.

In 1693, the Asimani of Akwamu led a raid and seized Osu Castle from the Danish colonists. The Akwamu thus controlled many of the trade routes from the interior to the coast in the eastern half of what is now Ghana and created a capital at Nyanoase.

In the 1720s a civil war in the Akwamu state caused great hardship. The victors sold most of the King's allies as slaves and they were transported to the Caribbean island of St. John. In 1733 they fomented a slave revolt on the island.
In 1734 the Akwamus were defeated by the Akyem, Ga, Kyerepong, and the Dutch forces, and lost half of their empire. The Akwamus were pushed to Akwamufie, the location of their current capital.

Organization 
Asamankese and Nyanoase served as the main capitals of Akwamu.  The seat of the Akwamu government was located at Nyanoase. Between 1681 and 1701, it was from Nyanoase that the government administered over several ports across the Gold and Slave Coasts. Aside from the coast, Akwamu established trade networks with Dagbon and Gonja up north, Akyem northwest, while eastward, they traded with Adra and Whydah. Akwamu generated wealth through commodity circulation, fines, taxes and tributes. An account of the city in 1684 is the oldest recorded description of the city which Swartz and Dumett quote as;
 
Erik Tileman documented in the late seventeenth century that the capital was two Danish miles long and 160 feet wide as there was a single major street that contained the royal residence at the center of the city.  The street was flanked with state buildings, courts, council buildings, stool and treasury houses as well as shrines. Nyanoase along with other metropolitan cities, contained large plantations; some of which were royal or state plantations. Taxes or tributes were paid occasionally by the towns and villages within the jurisdiction of the empire. 
European forts on the Accra coast paid rents for their forts and lodges in the form of gold, cowries or imported merchandise.

Military 
According to Wilks, “Akwamu possessed such an array of cannon that Sir Dalby Thomas thought the days of European forts might well be over.” Despite possessing artillery, the bulk of the army was centred on the musketeers, bowmen and spearmen. Akwamu might have influenced the military organization and civil administration of the Ashanti Empire. Akwamu and the founder of the Ashanti Empire had formed an alliance since the late 17th century. Akwamu also formed an alliance with some Fante westwards. During the reign of King Akwonno, the Dutch signed a treaty with Akwamu on 3 April 1702 which saw the Dutch bound themselves to assist Akwamu in any justified war, with a force of 100 fully armed men, 3000 pounds of gunpowder as well as 300 pounds of bullets.

List of rulers of the state of Akwamu

References

Bibliography 

History of Ghana
History of the United States Virgin Islands
Slave rebellions